Blowing Hot and Cold is a 1989 Australian comedy-drama film directed by Marc Gracie and starring Joe Dolce and Peter Adams. The plot is about an Italian who befriends a garage owner whose daughter has run off with a drug dealer.

Premise
Two people from Italy and Australia set their cultural differences aside to search for a girl who ran off with a drug dealer.

Cast
Peter Adams as Jack Phillips
Joe Dolce as Nino Patrovita
Kate Gorman as Sally Phillips

Production
It was originally announced the film would be made in 1984 starring Arkie Whiteley directed by Brian Trenchard-Smith.

The film was shot in Redesdale, Victoria, Kyneton, Diggers Rest, Victoria, Taradale, Victoria and Melbourne.

References

External links

Blowing Hot and Cold at Oz Movies

1989 films
1989 comedy-drama films
Films with screenplays by Sergio Donati
Films with screenplays by Luciano Vincenzoni
Films shot in Melbourne
Australian comedy-drama films
1980s English-language films
1980s Australian films
English-language comedy-drama films